Judo at the 2019 African Games was held on 17 and 18 August 2019 in Rabat, Morocco.

The event served as a qualifier for the 2020 Summer Olympics in Tokyo, Japan.

Participating nations

Medal table

Medal summary

Men

Women

References

External links
 
 Results

2019 African Games
African Games
2019 African Games
2019